Agyneta protrudens is a species of sheet weaver found in Canada and the United States. It was described by Chamberlin & Ivie in 1933.

References

protrudens
Arthropods of the United States
Spiders of North America
Spiders described in 1933